The 10th Naples Grand Prix was a motor race, run to Formula One rules, held on 28 April 1957 at Posillipo Circuit, Naples. The race was run over 60 laps of the circuit, and was won by British driver Peter Collins in a Lancia-Ferrari D50.

Results

References

Naples Grand Prix
Grand Prix of Naples